Li Weikang (born 1947) is a Chinese opera singer and a professor in theater arts.

Early life 
In 1947, Li was born in China.

Career 
Since 1966, Li has been with the National Peking Opera. In 1984, Li won the First China Plum Blossom and award.

As of 2010, in additional to performing Chinese opera, Li is a professor at the National Academy of Chinese Theatre Arts.
In 2010, Li performed as Yuji, an imperial consort, in The Hegemon-King Bids His Concubine Farewell.

Li is a retired Peking opera performer who specializes in Dan roles. She has served as vice-chairperson of the China Federation of Literary and Art Circles and the China Theatre Association.

Personal life 
Li's husband is Geng Qichang.

References

Additional sources

External links 
 Image of Li Weikang dressed in Chinese opera style

1947 births
Living people
Chinese Peking opera actresses
Actresses from Beijing
Singers from Beijing
20th-century Chinese actresses
Chinese television actresses
20th-century Chinese women singers
Middle School Affiliated to the National Academy of Chinese Theatre Arts alumni